Walter Rosenkranz (born 29 July 1962) is an Austrian politician and lawyer who was a member of the National Council for the Freedom Party of Austria (FPÖ) from 2008 to 2019, when he became one of three national public advocates (a Volksanwalt).

Before that, he was parliamentary group leader of the FPÖ in the National Council between 2017 and 2019 and served as leader of the Lower Austrian FPÖ.

On 12 July 2022, the FPÖ selected Rosenkranz as its official candidate for the 2022 Austrian presidential election, to be held on 9 October 2022,  but lost to incumbent Austrian president Alexander Van der Bellen. He is not related to Barbara Rosenkranz, FPÖ candidate for president in the 2010 Austrian presidential election.

References

1962 births
Living people
Ombudsmen in Austria
Members of the National Council (Austria)
Freedom Party of Austria politicians
People from Krems an der Donau